Moulin-à-Vent is a French red wine of controlled designation of origin produced on the border between the Rhône and Saône-et-Loire departments.

The appellation covers part of the towns of Chénas and Romanèche-Thorins, in the Beaujolais vineyards. It is one of the 10 crus, which are from north to south: le saint-amour, le juliénas, le chénas, le moulin-à-vent, le fleurie, le chiroubles, le morgon, le régnié, le brouilly and le côte-de-brouilly.

This wine was sold before 1936 under the name of “Romanèche-Thorins” which was once considered a Beaujolais cru. The name is changed to "windmill" when it is recognized by the National Institute of Origin and Quality (INAO) as a controlled designation of origin (AOC) by the decree of September 11, 1936.

References

Red wine